The Danish Social Liberal Party is a social-liberal political party in Denmark. The party was founded as a split from the Venstre Reform Party in 1905.

Historically, the centrist party has played a central role in Danish politics and has supported governments on both sides of the political spectrum, as co-operation is a primary belief of the party. A pro-European party, it is a member of Liberal International and the ALDE, and has two MEPs in the Renew Europe group in the European Parliament.

History

1905–1930s 

The party was founded in 1905 as a split from the Venstre Reform Party. The initial impetus was the expulsion of Venstre's antimilitarist wing from the party in January 1905. The expelled members held a founding conference for the new party in Odense, on 21 May 1905. In addition to the differences over military spending, the social liberals also took a more positive view than Venstre towards measures that aimed to reduce social inequality. The party also became the political leg of the cultural radical movement. The party was cautiously open to aspects of the welfare state, and also advocated reforms to improve the position of smallholders, an important early group of supporters. The party's social-liberal ideals are said to have been inspired by the political economists Henry George and John Stuart Mill. Until 1936 party was member of the International Entente of Radical and Similar Democratic Parties.

The first Social Liberal Cabinet was formed in 1909 with Carl Theodor Zahle serving as Prime Minister (1909–1910). From 1913 to 1920, Zahle led the second Social Liberal Cabinet with the Social Democrats serving as parliamentary support, keeping Denmark neutral during World War I. During the Great Depression of the 1930s, the party served as coalition partners along with the Social Democrats, led by Prime Minister Thorvald Stauning, and managed to lead the country through the recession by implementing far-reaching social reforms.

Post-World War II 
After 1945 the party continued with its pragmatic ways, influencing either as coalition partner as parliamentary support. From 1957 to 1964 they served as coalition partners in a Social Democratic led government, while Hilmar Baunsgaard served as Prime Minister 1968–1971 in a coalition government with Venstre and the Conservative People's Party as partners. In the 1968 general elections the party reached an all-time high of 15% of the vote, while they only received 11.2% in the 1973 landslide election.

During the 1980s the party served either as parliamentary support or as coalition partner in various Conservative led governments.

After an all-time low in the 1990 general elections where the party only received 3.5% of the vote, the party once again started cooperating with the Social Democrats under leadership of Poul Nyrup Rasmussen, participating in a coalition government in 1993.

2001–present 
In the early 2000s the political scene was marked by "bloc"-politics, with "blue bloc" being led by Venstre and "red bloc" by the Social Democrats. The Danish People's Party overtook the Social Liberals' key position as prime candidate for parliamentary support. Furthermore, the DPP's anti-immigrant policies made the Social Liberals profile themselves as a progressive party being pro-globalisation, pro-EU and more tolerant towards refugees and immigrants. At the same time the party profiled itself on reforming the welfare system, campaigning to abolish "efterløn" and lower taxes. As such the party served to unite a modern social profile with a more liberal economic profile. This served to appeal the more well-educated urbanised parts of the country, resulting in 9.2% of the vote at the 2005 general elections.

In a 2006 press release they tried to mark themselves as once again being able to lead a government, doing away with the presumption of the party only being able to serve as government partner or parliamentary support. The strategy proved unpopular both among voters and within the party itself. On 7 May 2007 MP Naser Khader and MEP Anders Samuelsen left the party and formed the New Alliance, known today as the Liberal Alliance, along with Conservative MEP Gitte Seeberg. At a press conference on 15 June 2007, it was announced that MP Margrethe Vestager would take over leadership of the party after Marianne Jelved, and that the party would rethink its strategy. The party returned to its historical role as possible coalition partner and at the political centre of Danish politics. Vestager clarified during the run-up to the 2007 general election that her party would only be supporting a government led by the Social Democrats. Still, the party only won 5.1% of the vote.

At the subsequent 2011 general elections, the party support rose to 9.5% and regained 8 seats to resume a total of 17. Together with the Social Democrats and the Socialist People's Party, they formed a three-way government coalition.

On 31 August 2014, Prime Minister Helle Thorning-Schmidt nominated Margrethe Vestager as Denmark's EU Commissioner, resulting in her resignation as party leader. The party's parliamentary group subsequently elected Morten Østergaard as new leader.

At the 2015 general elections, the party lost 9 out of 17 seats and was reduced to 4.6%. The party lost a share of its voters to the newly formed The Alternative, a Green political party formed by former member of the party Uffe Elbæk.

At the 2019 general elections, the party rose to 8.6% of the vote, doubling its number of seats to 16. Østergaard stated that he would support a government led by the Social Democrats only if changes would be made to the previous government's strict immigration policies.

On 7 October 2020 Morten Østergaard stepped down as leader of the party following allegations of sexual harassment from within the party. Sofie Carsten Nielsen was elected new leader the same day.

Nielsen resigned on 2 November 2022 following the loss of 9 out of 16 seats in the 2022 Danish general election. The Social Liberal Party had instigated the election by threatening a vote of no confidence against Mette Frederiksen's government in July 2022 due to the 2020 Danish mink cull. One day later, Martin Lidegaard became leader of the party.

Relationship to other parties 
The Danish Social Liberal Party has traditionally kept itself in the centre of the political scale. Since the early 1990s, though, it has primarily cooperated with the Social Democrats. Internationally, the party has cooperated with the Swedish Centre Party and Liberals, the Norwegian Venstre party, the Dutch Democrats 66 and the British Liberal Democrats.

Etymology 
The literal translation of the party's name Radical Left refers to its origin as the historically radical wing of its parent party Venstre (Left). In a modern context, this literal translation is somewhat misleading, as the party is considered to be centrist in the Danish political spectrum. The use of Left in the name of the party, as with the Norwegian party Venstre, is meant to refer to liberalism and not modern left-wing politics. The Danish Venstre was originally to the left of the conservative and aristocratic right-wing party Højre, whose name meant Right.

Prominent members

Prime Ministers
 Carl Theodor Zahle, Prime Minister 1909–1910 and 1913–1920, (Minister of Justice 1929–1935)
 Erik Scavenius, Prime Minister 1942–1945 (de facto until 29 August 1943), (Foreign Minister 1909–1910, 1913–1920 and 1940–1943 de facto/–1945 de jure )
 Hilmar Baunsgaard, Prime Minister 1968–1971, (Trade Minister 1961–1964)

Other ministers 

 Edvard Brandes, Finance Minister 1909–1910 and 1913–1920
 Christopher Krabbe, Defence Minister 1909–1910
 Peter Rochegune Munch, Minister of the Interior 1909–1910, Defence Minister 1913–1920, Foreign Minister 1929–1940
 Poul Christensen, Agriculture Minister 1909–1910
 Ove Rode, Minister of the Interior 1913–1920
 J. Hassing-Jørgensen, Minister for Public Works 1913–1920
 Kristjan Pedersen, Agriculture Minister 1913–1920
 Bertel Dahlgaard, Minister of the Interior 1929–1940, Minister for Economic Affairs and Minister for Nordic Co-operation 1957–1960
 Jørgen Jørgensen, Education Minister 1935–1940, 1942–1942, 1957–1960, Minister of the Interior 1942–1943
 A. M. Hansen, Education Minister 1945–1945
 Kjeld Philip, Trade Minister 1957–1960, Finance Minister 1960–1961, Minister for Economic Affairs 1961–1962
 Karl Skytte, Agriculture Minister 1957–1964
 A. C. Normann, Fishery Minister 1960–1964, Fishery Minister and Minister for Greenland 1968–1971
 Helge Larsen, Education Minister 1968–1971
 Lauge Dahlgaard, Labour Minister 1968–1971
 Jens Bilgrav-Nielsen, Energy Minister 1988–1990
 Kristen Helveg Petersen, Education Minister 1961–1964, Minister of Culture 1968–1971
 Niels Helveg Petersen, Minister for Economic Affairs 1988–1990, Foreign Minister 1993–2000
 Ole Vig Jensen, Minister of Culture 1988–1990, Education Minister, 1993–1998, Church Minister, 1996–1998
 Lone Dybkjær, Minister for the Environment 1988–1990
 Aase Olesen, Social Minister 1988–1990
 Ebbe Lundgaard, Minister of Culture 1996–1998
 Elsebeth Gerner Nielsen, Minister of Culture 1998–2001
 Marianne Jelved, Minister for Economic Affairs 1993–2001, Minister for Nordic Co-operation 1994–2001, Minister for Culture 2012–2015
 Margrethe Vestager, Education Minister 1998–2001, Church Minister 1998–2000, Minister for Economic and Interior Affairs 2011–2014
 Anita Bay Bundegaard, Minister for Development Cooperation 2000–2001
 Johannes Lebech, Church Minister 2000–2001
 Christian Friis Bach, Minister for Development Cooperation 2011–2013
 Uffe Elbæk, Minister of Culture 2011–2012
 Morten Østergaard, Minister for Research, Innovation and Higher Education 2011–2014, Minister for Taxation 2014–2014 Minister for Economic and Interior Affairs 2014-2015
 Martin Lidegaard, Minister for Climate and Energy 2011–2014, Minister for Foreign Affairs 2014–2015
 Manu Sareen, Minister for Equality, Church and Nordic Cooperation 2011–2014, Minister for Integration and Social Affairs 2014–2015
 Rasmus Helveg Petersen, Minister for Development Cooperation 2013–2014, Minister for Climate and Energy 2014–2015
 Sofie Carsten Nielsen, Minister for Research, Innovation and Higher Education 2014–2015

Political leaders 

 1905–1928: Carl Theodor Zahle
 1928–1940: Peter Rochegune Munch
 1940–1960: Jørgen Jørgensen
 1960–1968: Karl Skytte
 1968–1975: Hilmar Baunsgaard
 1975–1978: Svend Haugaard
 1978–1990: Niels Helveg Petersen
 1990–2007: Marianne Jelved
 2007–2014: Margrethe Vestager
 2014–2020: Morten Østergaard
 2020–2022: Sofie Carsten Nielsen
 2022–present: Martin Lidegaard

Election results

Parliament

Local elections

European Parliament

See also
 Liberalism and radicalism in Denmark
 Contributions to liberal theory
 Liberal democracy
 Liberalism
 Liberalism worldwide
 List of liberal parties
 Radikal Ungdom

References

External links
 Det Radikale Venstre official site
 Radikale.net official open community site
 English summary
 Web site of the party's youth organisation (mainly in Danish)

1905 establishments in Denmark
Political parties established in 1905
Liberal International
Liberal parties in Denmark
Radical parties
Alliance of Liberals and Democrats for Europe Party member parties
Social liberal parties
Centre-left parties in Europe
Centrist parties in Denmark
Pro-European political parties in Denmark